George Frideric Handel's operas comprise 42 musical dramas that were written between 1705 and 1741 in various genres.  Though his large scale English language works written for the theatre are technically oratorios and not operas, several of them, such as Semele (1743), have become an important part of the opera repertoire. Other English language oratorios which are sometimes fully staged as operas include Saul, Samson, Hercules, Belshazzar, Theodora and Jephtha.

Parnasso in festa, a festa teatrale composed by Handel to an Italian text and performed in London to celebrate the royal wedding of Anne, Princess Royal and Prince William of Orange in 1734, has many characteristics of an opera.

List of works

See also
 Handel House Museum at 25 Brook Street and BBC Radio 3 worked in partnership to celebrate Handel's life and music in 2009, with BBC Radio 3 broadcasting the complete 42 operas, 8 January – 25 July 2009
 Handel's lost Hamburg operas
 List of compositions by George Frideric Handel
Handel Reference Database

References
Hicks, Anthony (1992), 'Handel, George Frideric' in The New Grove Dictionary of Opera, ed. Stanley Sadie (London) 
Warrack, John and West, Ewan (1992), The Oxford Dictionary of Opera, 782 pages, 
Some of the information in this article is taken from the related Dutch Wikipedia article.

External links
 Handel House - Listing of operas with pages on each one.

 
Lists of operas by composer